In differential geometry, Hilbert's theorem (1901) states that there exists no complete regular surface  of constant negative gaussian curvature  immersed in . This theorem answers the question for the negative case of which surfaces in  can be obtained by isometrically immersing complete manifolds with constant curvature.

History

 Hilbert's theorem was first treated by David Hilbert in "Über Flächen von konstanter Krümmung" (Trans. Amer. Math. Soc. 2 (1901), 87–99). 
 A different proof was given shortly after by E. Holmgren in "Sur les surfaces à courbure constante négative" (1902).
 A far-leading generalization was obtained by Nikolai Efimov in 1975.

Proof
The proof of Hilbert's theorem is elaborate and requires several lemmas. The idea is to show the nonexistence of an isometric immersion 

of a plane  to the real space . This proof is basically the same as in Hilbert's paper, although based in the books of Do Carmo and Spivak.

Observations: In order to have a more manageable treatment, but without loss of generality, the curvature may be considered equal to minus one, . There is no loss of generality, since it is being dealt with constant curvatures, and similarities of  multiply  by a constant. Furthermore,  denotes the geometric surface  with this inner product. If  is an isometric immersion, the same holds for 
.

The first lemma is independent from the other ones, and will be used at the end as the counter statement to reject the results from the other lemmas.

Proof's Sketch: 
Then, since  has an infinite area,  will have it too. 
The fact that the hyperbolic plane  has an infinite area comes by computing the surface integral with the corresponding coefficients of the First fundamental form. To obtain these ones, the hyperbolic plane can be defined as the plane with the following inner product around a point  with coordinates 

Since the hyperbolic plane is unbounded, the limits of the integral are infinite, and the area can be calculated through

Next it is needed to create a map, which will show that the global information from the hyperbolic plane can be transfer to the surface , i.e. a global isometry.  will be the map, whose domain is the hyperbolic plane and image the 2-dimensional manifold , which carries the inner product from the surface  with negative curvature.  will be defined via the exponential map, its inverse, and a linear isometry between their tangent spaces, 
.

That is 
,

where . That is to say, the starting point  goes to the tangent plane from  through the inverse of the exponential map. Then travels from one tangent plane to the other through the isometry , and then down to the surface  with another exponential map.

Then  preserves the first fundamental form. 
In a geodesic polar system, the Gaussian curvature  can be expressed as 
.

In addition K is constant and fulfills the following differential equation 

Since  and  have the same constant Gaussian curvature, then they are locally isometric (Minding's Theorem). Furthermore, from the Hadamard's theorem it follows that  is also a covering map. 
Since  is simply connected,  is a homeomorphism, and hence, a (global) isometry.

The following 2 lemmas together with lemma 8 will demonstrate the existence of a parametrization 

Lemma 5:  is a local diffeomorphism.

Lemma 6:  is surjective.

Lemma 8:  is injective.

Proof of Hilbert's Theorem: 
First, it will be assumed that an isometric immersion from a complete surface  with negative curvature exists: 

As stated in the observations, the tangent plane  is endowed with the metric induced by the exponential map  . This result was provided by Lemma 4. This is a contradiction and the proof is concluded.

See also 
 Nash embedding theorem, states that every Riemannian manifold can be isometrically embedded into some Euclidean space.

References

 , Differential Geometry of Curves and Surfaces, Prentice Hall, 1976.
 , A Comprehensive Introduction to Differential Geometry, Publish or Perish, 1999.

Hyperbolic geometry
Theorems in differential geometry
Articles containing proofs